Fred Waitzkin (born 1943 in Massachusetts) is an American novelist and writer for The New York Times Sunday Magazine, New York, and Esquire. He graduated Kenyon College in Gambier, Ohio in 1965, and lives in New York City and Martha's Vineyard.

Waitzkin is the father of chess prodigy Joshua Waitzkin and wrote a book about his son called Searching for Bobby Fischer; he felt that Joshua could be a successor to Bobby Fischer. The book was praised by Grandmaster Nigel Short, as well as chess journalist Edward Winter, who called it "a delightful book" in which "the topics [are] treated with an acuity and grace that offer the reviewer something quotable on almost every page." Screenwriter and playwright Tom Stoppard called the book "well written" and "captivating". The book was made into the Academy Award-nominated  namesake film (but released in the U.K. as Innocent Moves), with Joe Mantegna playing Waitzkin.

Major works 
1988: Searching for Bobby Fischer: The Father of a Prodigy Observes the World of Chess

The Dream Merchant

See also 
List of books and documentaries by or about Bobby Fischer

References

External links 
 

20th-century American novelists
American male novelists
American chess writers
Jewish American novelists
Kenyon College alumni
Living people
1943 births
20th-century American male writers
20th-century American non-fiction writers
American male non-fiction writers
21st-century American Jews